The 1983 Women's World Snooker Championship was a women's snooker tournament that took place from 21 to 28 May 1983 at Pontins Brean Sands Holiday Club, Brean. It was the 1983 edition of the World Women's Snooker Championship, first held in 1976 and was sponsored by Pontins. The tournament was won by Sue Foster, who defeated Maureen Baynton 8–5 in the final.

The top seed was Sue LeMaich. The defending champion from the previous staging of the event in 1981, Vera Selby, decided not to enter in 1983. Fourth seed Mandy Fisher was beaten by 13-year-old Stacey Hillyard in the third round. In the first semi-final, LeMaich lost the last two frames in a 5–6 defeat by Baynton. In the other semi-final, Foster led Lesley McIlrath 3–0, but later found herself 4–5 behind. Baynton led 4–3 after the first session of the final, but won only one further frame in the second session, with Foster winning 8–5. Foster received £2,000 prize money for her win, and Baynton received £1,000 as runner-up.

Prize fund 

Winner: £2,000
Runner-up: £1,000
Semi-finals: £500
Quarter-finals: £250
Last 16 (fourth round): £100

Main draw

References 

1983 in English sport
1983 in snooker
1983 in women's sport
May 1983 sports events in the United Kingdom
International sports competitions hosted by England
1983